The FIDE Grand Swiss Tournament 2021 was a chess tournament that forms part of the qualification cycle for the World Chess Championship 2022. It was an 11-round Swiss-system tournament, with 108 players competing, running from 25 October to 8 November 2021 in Riga, Latvia, in parallel with the FIDE Women's Grand Swiss Tournament 2021. The tournaments were held while Latvia was in a COVID-19 lockdown, which led to a number of players withdrawing before the tournament began.

The tournament was won by Alireza Firouzja. The top two finishers, Firouzja and Fabiano Caruana, qualified for the Candidates Tournament 2022. The rest of the top eight, Grigoriy Oparin, Yu Yangyi, Vincent Keymer, Maxime Vachier-Lagrave, Alexandr Predke and Alexei Shirov, qualified for the FIDE Grand Prix 2022.

Format

The tournament was played as an 11-round Swiss system tournament.

Tie-breaks
For players who finish on the same score, final position is determined by the following tie-breaks, in order:
 Buchholz Cut 1 method — "the sum of the scores of each of the opponents of a player" but "reduced by the lowest score of the opponents";
 Buchholz method — "the sum of the scores of each of the opponents of a player";
 Sonneborn–Berger score — "the sum of the scores of the opponents a player has defeated (including wins by forfeit) and half the scores of the players with whom he has drawn";
 The results of individual games between tied players;
 Drawing of lots.
This is a change from the 2019 tournament, in which the average opponent rating (excluding the lowest rated opponent) was used as the first tie-break.

Venue and schedule
The tournament was originally scheduled to be running from 27 October to 7 November 2021 on the Isle of Man. However, due to complications arising from the COVID-19 pandemic in the United Kingdom, FIDE announced it would change the venue. Their stated concerns were that too many attendees would have to self-isolate under COVID-19 travel quarantine rules in the United Kingdom. On 9 August FIDE announced Riga, capital of Latvia, as the new venue. Due to a rise in COVID-19 cases, Latvia went into a lockdown beginning on 21 October, but FIDE announced that the Grand Swiss tournaments were exempt from this lockdown, and would proceed as scheduled. 

The 11 rounds were played from 27 October to 7 November, with a rest day on 2 November. 25 October was scheduled as the "Arrivals" day, with the opening ceremony on 26 October and the closing ceremony on 8 November. Games start at 2pm local time. This corresponds to 1100 UTC from October 27 to 30, and 1200 UTC Time from October 31 onwards.

Qualifiers
Originally, 114 players were to be invited:

 100 qualifiers by rating: the top 100 by the average of the 12 rating lists from 1 July 2020 to 1 June 2021;
 1 place for the Women's World Chess Champion, Ju Wenjun;
 4 places, one nominated by each of the four FIDE continental presidents;
 4 nominations of the FIDE president;
 5 nominations of the organizer, including 2 local nominees, and 1 online qualifier.

In August 2021, a list of 100 qualifiers by rating, plus 20 reserves, was announced. A number of players declined invitations, including 12 of the top 20 qualifiers: Magnus Carlsen and Ian Nepomniachtchi (playing the World Chess Championship 2021); Teimour Radjabov, Sergey Karjakin and Jan-Krzysztof Duda (already qualified for the Candidates); Wang Hao (retired); and Ding Liren, Wesley So, Anish Giri, Leinier Domínguez, Viswanathan Anand and Veselin Topalov. In September 2021, 114 players were announced as playing.

In the week before the tournament, a number of players withdrew due to concerns over the COVID-19 pandemic in Latvia. This included 5 of top 10 seeds: Alexander Grischuk, Richárd Rapport, Shakhriyar Mamedyarov, Hikaru Nakamura, Vidit Gujrathi; as well as Lê Quang Liêm, Salem Saleh, Bassem Amin, Gadir Guseinov, Arkadij Naiditsch, Étienne Bacrot, Maxime Lagarde, Sandro Mareco, Alexander Motylev, Ilya Smirin, Aravindh Chithambaram and Robert Hess.

The starting list of 108 participants is shown below.

Results 
The following table lists all participants, with the results from the 11 rounds. They are ranked according to the results, taking into account the tie-breaks. Nikita Vitiugov, Yuriy Kryvoruchko and Nils Grandelius are tied for 23rd place, as they scored the same on all tie-breaks. 

Notation: "1 (W 102)" indicates a win (1 point) with white pieces (W) against player of rank 102 (David Paravyan). The first tiebreak (labeled BC1) is the Buchholz Cut 1 score, which was sufficient to determine the qualifiers.

Notes

References

External links
 FIDE Grand Swiss 2021, FIDE official site.
 FIDE Grand Swiss 2021 (Full standings and tie-break scores), The Week in Chess

FIDE Grand Swiss Tournament
2021 in chess
2021 in Latvian sport
October 2021 sports events in Europe
November 2021 sports events in Europe
Chess in Latvia